James Alexander may refer to:

 James Alexander (1769–1848), British banker, and Member of Parliament for Old Sarum 1812–1832
 James Alexander (lawyer) (1691–1756), American lawyer and politician of the colonial period
 James Alexander, 1st Earl of Caledon (1730–1802), Irish landlord, merchant, politician and peer of the realm
 James Alexander Jr. (1789–1846), U.S. Congressman from Ohio
 James Alexander, 3rd Earl of Caledon (1812–1855)
 James Alexander, 4th Earl of Caledon (1846–1898), soldier and politician
 Jim Alexander (footballer) (1899–1972), Australian rules footballer
 James Alexander (cricketer) (1916–1943), English cricketer
 Jim Alexander (photographer) (born 1935), American documentary photographer
 James Alexander (musician) (born 1949), American bassist
 James Edward Alexander (1803–1885), British soldier and traveller
 James M. Alexander (1815–1871), African-American businessperson and politician in Arkansas
 James P. Alexander (1883–1948), Justice of the Supreme Court of Texas
 James Peterkin Alexander (1835–1912), Scottish-born politician in Manitoba, Canada
 James R. Alexander (1930–2019), American sound engineer
 James S. Alexander (1865–1932), American banker
 James Tavian Alexander (born c. 1959, a.k.a. James Alexander McQuirter), Grand Wizard on the Canadian Knights of the Ku Klux Klan in the 1980s
 James Thomas Alexander (1888–1952), US Navy Captain
 James Waddel Alexander (1804–1859), American Presbyterian minister and author
 James Waddell Alexander II (1888–1971), American mathematician & topologist
 James Woodie Alexander II (1916–1996), American singer, songwriter and record producer